Abbas-e Kalpat (also Romanized as ‘Abbās-e Kalpat, ‘Abbās-e Galpat, and ‘Abbās Kolpat) is a village in Veysian Rural District, Veysian District, Dowreh County, Lorestan Province, Iran. As of the 2006 census, it had a population was 98 individuals comprising 20 families.

References 

Towns and villages in Dowreh County